This is a list of episodes of the British comedy Mind Your Language.

Overview

Series 1

Series 2

Series 3

Series 4
The series was resurrected for the export market by an independent producer in 1985, 

TSW was the first ITV region to show the series 30 September – 31 December 1985, (Mondays later Tuesdays 6:30pm)
Channel Television via the TSW network feed on the above dates
Granada Television all episodes from 4 January – 12 April 1986, (Saturdays 2:15pm)
Anglia: all episodes, from 9 January – 3 April 1986. (Thursdays 7:00pm) 
Central: all episodes, shown as one block of four (1 – 22 February 1986) and one block of nine (12 July – 6 September 1986).
HTV West: all episodes over a period from 1 February 1986 – 6 March 1987 (*Series 4 not shown in the Welsh part of the HTV region)
Tyne Tees: nine episodes from 1 February – 29 March 1986 (4 episodes not scheduled/shown)
Border: four episodes, from 1–22 February 1986 (9 episodes not scheduled/shown) (In both Tyne Tees and Border cases some of those unscheduled episodes could have been shown at short notice due to last minute programme changes as replacements for originally scheduled programmes)

Grampian, *HTV Wales*, Thames/LWT (London ITV contractors. All series of the show, including the revival, were produced in London.) Yorkshire, TVS, Scottish and Ulster did not broadcast series 4.

IMDB for Series 4 list the Granada dates

External links
 

Lists of British sitcom episodes